Gunther Eysenbach is a German-Canadian researcher on healthcare, especially health policy, eHealth, and consumer health informatics.

Career
Eysenbach was born on 22 March 1967 in West Berlin, West Germany. While a medical student, he served on the executive board as elected communication director, later as vice-president of the European Medical Students' Association. He received an M.D. from the University of Freiburg and a Master of Public Health from Harvard School of Public Health. From 1999 to 2002 he founded and headed a research unit on cybermedicine and ehealth at the University of Heidelberg and organized and chaired the World Congress on Internet in Medicine. In March 2002, he emigrated to Canada and since then has been senior scientist at the Centre for Global eHealth Innovation at the University Health Network (Toronto, Ontario, Canada), and associate professor in the Institute of Health Policy, Management and Evaluation at the University of Toronto.

Eysenbach works in the field of consumer health informatics. He has written several books and articles, and organizes conferences. He is editor-in-chief of the Journal of Medical Internet Research. From 2000-2008, he served as working group chair for the WG Consumer Health Informatics of the International Medical Informatics Association.

Other contributions include:
 Initiator, organizer, and chair of the annual Medicine 2.0 Congress
 Eysenbach has conducted a study on the association between search engine queries and influenza incidence, which was replicated by other research groups 2–3 years later. He coined the terms "infoveillance" and "infodemiology" for these kinds of approaches.
 Eysenbach is initiator of WebCite, an archiving service for scholarly authors and editors citing webpages.
 Together with his former student Paul Kudlow, he cofounded  TrendMD, a scholarly recommendation system and cross-publisher content marketing platform 
 He founded and serves as CEO for the Canadian publisher JMIR Publications, which is the publisher of the Journal of Medical Internet Research and 30 other open access journals; JMIR Publications is notable as one of Canada's fastest growing companies according to Business Insider 
 He co-founded the Open Access Scholarly Publishing Association (OASPA)

Books written or edited

See also 

WebCite – an on-demand Web archiving service founded by Eysenbach

References

External links
  (via the Internet Archive)
 Faculty page at the University of Toronto (via the Internet Archive)
 Profile on Google Scholar

1967 births
20th-century Canadian scientists
20th-century German scientists
21st-century Canadian scientists
Canadian medical researchers
German emigrants to Canada
Harvard School of Public Health alumni
Health informaticians
Academic staff of Heidelberg University
Living people
Scientists from Berlin
Scientists from Toronto
Academic staff of the University of Toronto